Hemileuca burnsi, the Burns' buckmoth, is a species of insect in the family Saturniidae. It is found in North America.

The MONA or Hodges number for Hemileuca burnsi is 7737.

References

Further reading

 
 
 

Hemileucinae
Articles created by Qbugbot
Moths described in 1910